Akashangalil is a 2015 Indian Malayalam-language film directed by Rixon Xavier, starring veteran actor Shankar in an extended special appearance.

Plot

Akashangalil is the story of Amala (Pooja Vijayan), a retired air hostess, as her marriage with her colleague, a pilot was a failure and divorced as well. Later she becomes close to her driver Ananthu, but Ananthu's family is against this relationship as well as marriage. At this time, Amala's old friend Devadathan (Shankar) who is also a divorcee comes forward to give a life to Amala.  Music directed by Abhijith P S Nair

Cast

Shankar - Devadathan
Pooja Vijayan - Amala
Renjith Raj 
Rakesh Krishna

References

External links 
 

2015 films
2010s Malayalam-language films